This list of Independent Baptist higher education institutions consists of institutions of higher education that are Independent Baptist in the United States.

Current schools
 Arlington Baptist University (Arlington, Texas)
 Baptist Bible College (Springfield, Missouri)
 Boston Baptist College (Boston, Massachusetts)
 Carolina University (formerly Piedmont International University) (Winston-Salem, North Carolina)
 Chesapeake Baptist College (Severn, Maryland)
 Crown College of the Bible (Powell, Tennessee)
 Detroit Baptist Theological Seminary (Allen Park, Michigan)
 Faith Baptist Bible College and Theological Seminary (Ankeny, Iowa)
 Golden State Baptist College (Santa Clara, California)
 Heartland Baptist Bible College (Oklahoma City, Oklahoma)
 Hyles-Anderson College (Crown Point, Indiana)
 Louisiana Baptist University (Shreveport, Louisiana)
 Maranatha Baptist University (Watertown, Wisconsin)
 Midwestern Baptist College (Pontiac, Michigan)
 New England Baptist College (Southington, CT)
 Pensacola Christian College (Pensacola, Florida)
 Temple Baptist Seminary (Winston-Salem, North Carolina)
 Trinity Baptist College (Jacksonville, Florida)
 West Coast Baptist College (Lancaster, California)

Former schools
 Baptist University of America (1971-1987)
 Pillsbury Baptist Bible College (Owatonna, Minnesota) (1957–2008)
 Tennessee Temple University (Chattanooga, Tennessee) (1946-2015)

See also
 Bob Jones University

References

Independent Baptist universities and colleges in the United States